A residence permit (less commonly residency permit) is a document or card required in some regions, allowing a foreign national to reside in a country for a fixed or indefinite length of time.
These may be permits for temporary residency, or permanent residency. The exact rules vary between regions. In some cases (e.g. the UK) a temporary residence permit is required to extend a stay past some threshold, and can be an intermediate step to applying for permanent residency.

Residency status may be granted for a number of reasons and the criteria for acceptance as a resident may change over time. In New Zealand the current range of conditions include being a skilled migrant, a retired parent of a New Zealand National, an investor and a number of others.

Biometric residence permit 
Some countries have adopted biometric residence permits, which are cards including embedded machine readable information and RFID NFC capable chips.

In Georgia 
Georgia (country) offers several types of temporary residency permits, such as work residence permit, for those with a work contract or business in the country, short-term residence permit, based on property ownership, and residence permit for family reunification. There are also other types of residency permits, like, e.g., student residency permit.

In Germany 
See German residence permit

In France 
See Permanent residency in France

In Italy

In Italy the residence permit (permesso di soggiorno) is released by the state police (Polizia di Stato); it must be requested by the immigrant to be allowed to reside in the country for more than eight days, or more than ninety days if having a travel visa (visto d'ingresso) for tourism. It is not required for European Union citizens.

In Singapore
See Permanent residency in Singapore

In Ukraine
In Ukraine there are two types of residence permits: temporary residence permit and permanent residence permit.
Temporary residence permit is issued, in general, for a period of 1 year provided that there is at least one of legal grounds for temporary stay in Ukraine. Permanent residence equals to immigration.

In the United States
See Permanent residence (United States)

In Saudi Arabia 
See Premium Residency

See also
 Residence Permit for Hong Kong, Macao, and Taiwan Residents (China)
 Residence card of a family member of a Union citizen (EU)

References

External links
 PRADO - Public Register of Authentic travel and identity Documents Online – contains information about and images of documents issued by countries in the European Union and Schengen Area.

Residence permit